Filipe Manuel Nunes Cândido (born 28 September 1979) is a Portuguese former footballer who played as a left winger, currently manager of C.D. Nacional.

Playing career
Born in Lisbon, Cândido played most of his youth career with local Sporting CP before concluding his development at Real Madrid where he trained in the first team under Fabio Capello. Turning down the prospect of a loan to CD Leganés to kickstart his career in Spain, he returned to his homeland with Vitória de Setúbal.

Cândido totalled 16 matches and two goals in the Primeira Liga for Setúbal and S.C. Salgueiros, and a further 42 appearances and three goals in the Segunda Liga for F.C. Felgueiras and Leça FC. He spent the vast majority of his career in the amateur divisions, however.

Internationally, Cândido earned 17 caps for Portugal at youth level. His sole game for the under-21 team was on 25 January 2000, in a 1–0 friendly win over the United States in Alverca do Ribatejo.

Coaching career
After retiring at UD Sousense in 2013, Cândido immediately became manager of the third division side. After a spell with the under-19s of F.C. Paços de Ferreira, he returned to the senior game on 11 November 2016 as manager of former club Salgueiros. He won seven of his 16 fixtures in charge, resigning the following 3 April due to disputes with the board.

On 25 December 2018, Cândido resumed his career with U.D. Leiria, still in division three. After winning their group, they lost in the play-off semi-finals to U.D. Vilafranquense in a penalty shootout. He quit on 29 January 2020, due to over four months of unpaid wages.

Cândido was given his first professional league managerial job on 20 May 2020, succeeding Vasco Seabra on a two-year deal with C.D. Mafra of the second tier. He resigned the following 14 April, after a run of four defeats put the team in 10th place after a good start to the season.

In June 2021, Cândido returned to Leiria, in the new Liga 3. He left on 19 October to replace Petit at Belenenses SAD in his first top-flight job; he signed an 18-month deal with the second-from-bottom club. On his debut six days later, he drew 0–0 away to Boavista FC.

On 27 November 2021, Cândido was only able to field nine players against S.L. Benfica due to a bout of COVID-19, most of them being from the under-23 side and two of them goalkeepers, including João Monteiro who made his professional debut as an emergency midfielder. Only seven returned for the second half with the score at 7–0, and shortly after Monteiro suffered an injury; the match was subsequently abandoned.

Cândido resigned on 10 January 2022 in spite of a 2–1 win over F.C. Arouca, following a run-in with chairman Rui Pedro Soares. On 25 May he was appointed for one season at C.D. Nacional. He took the second-tier club to the semi-finals of the Taça de Portugal with a 5–2 extra-time win at Casa Pia A.C. of the top flight.

Managerial statistics

References

External links

1979 births
Living people
Portuguese footballers
Footballers from Lisbon
Association football wingers
Primeira Liga players
Liga Portugal 2 players
Segunda Divisão players
Vitória F.C. players
S.C. Salgueiros players
F.C. Felgueiras players
Leça F.C. players
Académico de Viseu F.C. players
Imortal D.C. players
AC Vila Meã players
Lusitânia F.C. players
Jeju United FC players
FC Lokomotiv 1929 Sofia players
Kavala F.C. players
Portugal youth international footballers
Portugal under-21 international footballers
Portuguese expatriate footballers
Expatriate footballers in Spain
Expatriate footballers in South Korea
Expatriate footballers in Bulgaria
Expatriate footballers in Greece
Portuguese expatriate sportspeople in Spain
Portuguese expatriate sportspeople in South Korea
Portuguese expatriate sportspeople in Bulgaria
Portuguese expatriate sportspeople in Greece
Portuguese football managers
Primeira Liga managers
Liga Portugal 2 managers
S.C. Salgueiros managers
U.D. Leiria managers
Belenenses SAD managers
C.D. Nacional managers